Events in the year 1995 in the Netherlands.

Incumbents
 Monarch: Beatrix
 Prime Minister: Wim Kok

Events
18 to 23 July – The 1995 World Fencing Championships were held in The Hague.
1 to 11 August – The 18th World Scout Jamboree was held in Dronten.

Births

 
 

1 January – Kelly Vollebregt, handball player
9 January – Loiza Lamers, model
17 January – Jim van der Zee, singer
22 January – Jessie Jazz Vuijk, model and beauty pageant titleholder
25 January – Mark Caljouw, badminton player 

1 February – Oliver Heldens, DJ and electronic music producer 
3 February – Stijn Derkx, footballer 
3 February – Bram Verhofstad, artistic gymnast

2 March – Marije van Hunenstijn, sprinter
10 March – Sanne Vloet, model
28 March – Hamza Boukhari, footballer
21 March - Chadwick Tromp, baseball player

9 April – Demi Vermeulen, Paralympic equestrian
12 April – Melissa Venema, trumpeter
28 April – Derk Telnekes, darts player

1 May – Milan Vissie, footballer

7 June – Bas Veenstra, basketball player 

1 July – Julius van Sauers, basketball player 
2 July – Vinnie Vermeer, footballer
13 July – Glenn Bijl, footballer
15 July – Stef Krul, racing cyclist
19 July – Tom Noordhoff, footballer
19 July – Romee Strijd, model
21 July – Melissa Wijfje, speed skater 
27 July – Cees Bol, cyclist

18 August – Teuntje Beekhuis, cyclist
20 August – Julian Jordan, musician
29 August – Dante Klein, DJ and record producer

2 October – Anne van Dam, golf player
3 October – Snelle, rapper and singer
4 October – Ralf Mackenbach, singer, dancer and musical artist
9 October – Kenny Tete, footballer
22 October – Arno Kamminga, swimmer
26 October – Celeste Plak, volleyball player

7 November – Justin Mylo, DJ, record producer and musician 
12 November – Davina Michelle, singer and Youtuber
25 November – Denzel Comenentia, athlete specializing in hammer throw and shot put

Deaths

14 February – Ischa Meijer, journalist, television presenter, radio presenter, critic and author (b. 1943)
19 February – David Adriaan van Dorp, chemist (b. 1915)
25 March – John Hugenholtz, designer of race tracks and cars (b. 1914)
27 March – Tony Lovink, diplomat (b. 1902)
24 April – Lodewijk Bruckman, painter (b. 1903).
26 April – Frieda Belinfante, cellist and conductor (b. 1904)
21 May – Annie M. G. Schmidt, writer (b. 1911)
10 August – Gijs van Aardenne, politician (b. 1930)

Full date missing
Nico de Haas, photographer (b. 1907)

References

 
1990s in the Netherlands
Years of the 20th century in the Netherlands
Netherlands
Netherlands